Frank Bigelow (born July 22, 1954) is an American politician who served in the California State Assembly. Bigelow is a Republican who represented the 5th district, encompassing Gold Country and the central Sierra Nevada.

Early life 
On July 22, 1954, Bigelow was born in Fresno, California.

Career 
In 1973, Bigelow became an employee and later became the Vice President of Ponderosa Telephone Company.

In 1998, Bigelow was elected to the Madera County Board of Supervisors.  From 2006-2007, Bigelow served as President of California State Association of Counties.In 2007, Bigelow was appointed to become a member of the California Partnership for the San Joaquin Valley.

In 2012, Bigelow decided to campaign for the California State Assembly. On November 6, 2012, Bigelow won a surprise victory by defeating former state Senator Rico Oller, who had represented much of the area in both houses of the legislature before, and became California state Assemblyman for the 5th district.

Bigelow has also been a volunteer fireman in Madera County for more than 40 years. He is currently the fire captain at Madera County Volunteer Fire, Station 17 in O'Neals. He has served on the Board of Directors of American Shorthorn Association, Madera County Cattlemen’s Association, and Madera County Ag Boosters.

On February 17, 2022, Bigelow announced that he would not be a candidate for reelection.

Electoral history

2012 California State Assembly

2014 California State Assembly

2016 California State Assembly

}

2018 California State Assembly

2020 California State Assembly

Personal life 
In 1978, Bigelow married Barbara. They have three children.

See also 
 2012 California State Assembly election#District 5

References

External links 
 
 Campaign website
 Frank Bigelow at ballotpedia.org
 Bigelow Farms
 Join California Frank Bigelow
 

County supervisors in California
Republican Party members of the California State Assembly
Living people
People from Madera County, California
People from Fresno, California
1954 births
21st-century American politicians